Swarm is a supervillain appearing in American comic books published by Marvel Comics. The character's entire body is composed of bees, and is mainly featured as an enemy of Spider-Man.

Publication history

Swarm first appeared in The Champions #14 (July 1977). He was created by Bill Mantlo and John Byrne.

Fictional character biography
Fritz von Meyer was born in Leipzig, Germany and became one of Adolf Hitler's top scientists specializing in toxicology and melittology. Escaping capture after World War II, he was a beekeeper or apiarist in South America and discovered a colony of mutated bees. Intrigued by their intelligence and passive nature, von Meyer attempted to enslave the queen bee but failed and the bees devoured him, leaving only his skeleton. The bees' unique qualities caused von Meyer's consciousness to be absorbed into them, allowing him to manipulate the hive to do his will while his skeletal remains are inside the swarm itself. His consciousness merged with the hive to the extent that they are one being, calling himself/themselves "Swarm".

Swarm battled the Champions. After being defeated, Swarm resurfaced to battle Spider-Man. In the first of many fights, Spider-Man prevailed against him when the web-slinger's costume was dosed in a new type of insecticide that hurt the bees if they got too close. Swarm lost his/their skeleton in this battle but returned to fight again (no longer having the skeleton but still possessing von Meyer's consciousness), first teaming with Kraven the Hunter against Iceman and Firestar, then against Spider-Man, but feedback from a weapon fired by the Rhino caused Swarm's bee body to disperse temporarily.

Swarm next appears when a Super-Collider from Rand Industries is activated and called his/their attention. Swarm decides mankind should be exterminated so insects can rule the world. Doctor Druid convinced Swarm that mankind will exterminate themselves and the age of insects can begin. Eventually, Swarm was tired of waiting and returned to New York, after a psychic wave generated by Onslaught disrupted the psychic field that bonded him and the bees together. He forced a group of scientists investigating energy fields to help him not only restore his original field, but expand it to grant him control of every bee on Earth. As New York City is invaded by bees, the Scarlet Spider tracked the bees to their destination and — taking advantage of the fact that the swarms' instinctive memory of Raid caused the bees to automatically flinch away from Spider-Man — infiltrated the building to contact the scientists. By claiming that the scientists' equipment is having trouble broadcasting a sufficiently powerful signal through the dome of bees, Scarlet Spider is able to trick Swarm into allowing a device's construction designed to negate the vibrational frequency that the bees create to allow themselves to fly, presenting it as a means of boosting the existing signal's power. With the bees now grounded, Scarlet Spider subsequently recovers the queen of Swarm's hive and leaves the authorities' care, reasoning Swarm won't be a future threat without her.

Now back with an internal skeleton, Swarm felt that the criminal organization Pride's fall allowed access to their former territory, specifically Los Angeles. However, he/they are defeated by the Los Angeles' protector Runaways when his/their body of bees' mental link is disrupted by electrical blasts.

Swarm regained control over his colony and joins the Chameleon's Exterminators to kill their shared enemy now that Peter Parker's true identity is revealed. Swarm attacks Mary Jane Watson but the latter sprays Swarm with water while a co-worker smashes Swarm's skeleton, but the bees reformed around the skeleton as Stark Industries' bodyguards take him/them away.

When Alyosha Kravinoff began collecting a zoo of animal-themed superhumans, Swarm is in one of the cages. He fought Gargoyle as the Punisher passes them and escaped.

Swarm next turns up in Denver, Colorado, having amassed enough bees to become giant-sized. The Thunderbolts face him/them unsuccessfully until Venom devours Swarm's bones. Norman Osborn speculated this is a minor inconvenience that shouldn't prevent Swarm's return.

Swarm next turns up in Buenos Aires, having his intelligence again. He fought the Mighty Avengers by creating 'avatars' made of bees. Hank Pym, Stature and Amadeus Cho place an inhibitor collar on the queen bees which caused Swarm's intelligence to somehow disperse.

He was briefly seen trying to launch an attack of the Jean Grey School for Higher Learning only to be almost instantly thwarted by the X-Men's Krakoa, the Bamfs, and Doop.

Swarm later formed his own incarnation of the Sinister Six with 8-Ball, Delilah, Killer Shrike, Melter and Squid. They attack Spider-Man and the students of the Jean Grey School for Higher Learning. Swarm gets dispersed by Hellion which caused the other members to surrender.

Swarm later attacked New York but was defeated by Squirrel Girl and her ally Koi Boi covering him with water and turning bags full of his constituent bees in to the police.

Swarm later appeared as a member of the Hateful Hexad alongside Bearboarguy, Gibbon, Ox, Squid and White Rabbit. During the disastrous battle against Spider-Man and Deadpool, the battle is crashed by Itsy Bitsy.

Swarm relocates to Florida, where he encounters Macrothrax and his minions who are also sentient insect colonies in humanoid form, accidentally created by the invention behind him. He ends up joining forces with Ant-Man and taking a liking to the latter.

Powers and abilities
Fritz von Meyer is a composite being of thousand bees driven by his human intelligence. He is also technically intangible, as well as his body's an aggregate of tiny forms. As Swarm, he can fly through the air, assume any shape or size at will, and mentally influence other bee's actions (the full range may extend over a hundred yards in radius). At this end, Swarm seemed capable of controlling a mutant bee queen and through her countless drones. He even has exhibited a limited amount of super strength. As von Meyer, he possesses expertise in beekeeping, robotics, and toxicology.

Other versions

Marvel Fairy Tales
In the second issue of the Spider-Man line of Marvel Fairy Tales (an adaptation of the legend of Anansi), an alternate version of Swarm appears as the stories' main villain, the Yellow and purple spider.

Marvel Adventures
Swarm recently appeared and fought Spider-Man in Marvel Adventures. He/they supposedly wanted to take over the world (or at least kill a few jocks), but it looked like he/they just wanted some ice cream.

Ultimate Marvel
The Ultimate Marvel equivalent of Swarm is Petra Laskov, a Syrian female mutant. She was the wife of Georgian activist Nikolai Laskov. The couple's child is held at gunpoint, forcing Laskov to kill her husband to save her own child. She does so, only for Laskov's child to be killed anyway, and then Laskov was raped by thugs. Years later, she appears as the supervillainess Insect Queen of the supervillain Liberators group that invades the United States to kill many in order to put a stop to perceived American aggression. During a showdown with the Ultimates, Laskov is apparently killed after being stomped by the giant-sized Wasp. However, she is later rebuilt as the superheroine Red-Wasp by Nick Fury and Gregory Stark to be a member of their Avengers team. The Avengers fight the Red Skull, and later Laskov (disguised as a nurse) shoots her family's executioner in the head in a hospital. Her abilities as the inhuman-esque Swarm are to control insects (albeit fully corporeal) with Margali Szardos's similar features of grey skin and horns while her abilities as the human-looking Red-Wasp is an aggressive variation of the Wasp.

Marvel Noir
The Marvel Noir universe's equivalent is Madame Sturm, a Nazi scientist. She finds the same Spider-God totem behind Peter Parker's powers which she uses to mutate herself into a bee god and calls herself Madame Swarm. She is defeated when Spider-Man Noir lures her towards a Nazi blimp that Spider-Man blows up with the Venom sting.

In other media

Television
 An original incarnation of Swarm appears in a self-titled episode of Spider-Man and His Amazing Friends, voiced by Al Fann. This version is a beehive irradiated by a fallen meteorite's energy, gaining sentience as well as the ability to increase other bees' size and mutate humans into insect hybrid drones. Swarm attempts to spread its hive mind throughout the universe until Spider-Man, Firestar, and Iceman intervene and launch the meteorite back into space to reverse Swarm's effects.
 An original incarnation of Swarm named Michael Tan appears in Ultimate Spider-Man, voiced by Eric Bauza in his self-titled episode and Drake Bell in "Sandman Returns". This version is a disgruntled Stark Industries employee who built a device to control technology, only for it to fuse him with Spider-Man's spider-tracer at the molecular level, granting him the ability to control a swarm of self-replicating nanobots and assimilate technology.
 Fritz von Meyer / Swarm appears in Marvel Super Hero Adventures, voiced by Ian James Corlett.
 An original incarnation of Swarm, also known as Jefferson Davis, appears in Spider-Man, voiced by Alex Désert. This version utilizes purple nanotech bees that grant him a solid form and can use their stingers to brainwash humans.

Video games
Fritz von Meyer / Swarm appears in Marvel Strike Force as a member of the Sinister Six.

Miscellaneous
 Fritz von Meyer / Swarm appears in Spider-Man: Turn Off the Dark, played by Gerald Avery. This version was originally an Oscorp scientist before he was manipulated into becoming Swarm by the Green Goblin and joining his Sinister Six.
 The Symbiotic Warfare Anthophila Restraining Model (S.W.A.R.M.) appears in Marvel's Spider-Mans (2018) comic book adaptation, Spider-Man: City at War. Additionally, S.W.A.R.M. was intended to appear in the game, but was cut.

Merchandise
Fritz von Meyer / Swarm received an action figure in the Spider-Man: Spider Force toy line.

Reception
In August 2009, TIME listed Swarm as one of the "Top 10 Oddest Marvel Characters".

Swarm was ranked #29 on a listing of Marvel Comics' monster characters in 2015.

References

External links
 
 Swarm at Marvel.com

Fiction about beekeeping
Fictional bees
Fictional characters from Saxony
Fictional characters who can change size
Fictional characters who can turn intangible
Fictional characters with slowed ageing
Fictional collective consciousnesses
Fictional entomologists
Fictional Nazi fugitives
Fictional roboticists
Fictional superorganisms
Fictional toxicologists
Characters created by Bill Mantlo
Characters created by John Byrne (comics)
Comics characters introduced in 1977
Marvel Comics characters who are shapeshifters
Marvel Comics characters with superhuman strength
Marvel Comics mutates
Marvel Comics Nazis
Marvel Comics scientists
Marvel Comics supervillains
Spider-Man characters